Pink Rose is the first political LGBT association in Finland. It was formed during the 2004 Helsinki Pride by Jani Ryhänen, who is currently serving as president. The day the association formed, the second vice president of the Social Democratic Party of Finland and Minister of Labour, Tarja Filatov joined.

See also

LGBT rights in Finland
List of LGBT rights organisations

External links

Jani Ryhänen's blog

LGBT political advocacy groups in Finland
2004 establishments in Finland
Organizations established in 2004